Ko Chang-soo  (born December 5, 1934 in Hungnam) is a Korean poet and diplomat.

Chang obtained a Doctor of Letters degree from Sungkyunkwan University in Seoul, Korea. He wrote his dissertation on Buddhist thoughts in T. S. Eliot's Four Quartets.   He served his country as a career diplomat, serving as South Korean consul general in Seattle, Washington in the United States and ambassador to Ethiopia and Pakistan.

His poetry is written in Korean, but he has translated much of his own as well as other Korean poetry.  In addition to publishing having a number poetry collections, he has had poems published in such journals as World Poetry, Viewpoint 11,  and Curious Cats.   Ko has won various Korean poetry prizes as well as  the Lucian Blaga International Poetry Festival Grand Prize in Romania.  Some of his poetry has also been translated into Spanish.  He also has won the Modern Korean Literature Translation Award.

Much of Ko's poetry reflects his knowledge of Western culture and literature, as seen in such poems as "To Marc Chagall."  Other poems examine and reflect on his experience in Korea (e.g., "In a Remote Korean Village") and other places around the world (e.g., his long poem, "Mohenjo-Daro").  Many, though not all, of his poems are set out-of-doors.  Some of these place the poet in the setting.

Publications
 What the Spider Said: Poems of Chang Soo Ko.  Translated by the poet.   (2004)
 Between Sound and Silence:  Poems of Chang Soo Ko.  Hollym: Elizabeth, NJ /Seoul. 2000. (Poems in original Korean and with English translations by the poet.)
 Sound of Silence: Poems.  Leo Books. (1996)
 Seattle Poems. Poetry Around Press, Seattle. (1992)
 Park, Je-chun  1997  Sending the Ship out to the Stars:  Poems of Park Je-chun.  Translated from the Korean by Ko Chang-soo.  East Asia Program, Cornell University:  Ithaca, NY.

Sources and external links
 About Ko:  https://web.archive.org/web/20060909180100/http://langtech.dickinson.edu/sirena/Issue4/Ko.htm
 https://web.archive.org/web/20100124052721/http://www.homabooks.com/general/books/east_asia/korea/1024.php (includes "Ex-diplomat Poet Weaves Metaphors from Spider Web" by Iris Moon, The Korea Herald McCann, Daniel 2000  "Preface" to Between Sound and Silence''.
 Some of his poems in English: https://web.archive.org/web/20070928003705/http://www.poemworld.co.kr/lhw/reboard/list.php3?custom=poem
 some of his poems in English:  https://web.archive.org/web/20070927121357/http://www.munhakac.co.kr/reboard/list.php3?custom=English

20th-century South Korean poets
Ambassadors of South Korea to Ethiopia
Ambassadors of South Korea to Pakistan
1934 births
Living people
Sungkyunkwan University alumni
People from South Hamgyong
21st-century South Korean poets
Korean male poets
20th-century male writers
21st-century male writers